UTG may refer to:
 United Tasmania Group, the world's first Green party to contest elections
 Quthing Airport, the IATA code UTG
 Urban Transport Group, a British transport organisation created in 2016
 University of the Gambia, an institution of higher education located in Sere Kunda
 Underneath the Gun, a Christian deathcore and metalcore band from Corona, California
 Union Terrace Gardens, public park and gardens in Aberdeen, Scotland